Nether Handley is a hamlet in North East Derbyshire in the county of Derbyshire in England.

Location
Nether Handley lies just south of the village of Marsh Lane, south-west of Eckington, and around 4 miles south of the village of Ridgeway, and north of New Whittington. In 1895 it was part of the parish of Staveley.

History
Nether Handley has historically been a small, agricultural hamlet. The Hagge, a c. 1630 mansion, is Grade II* listed.

References

External links

Nether Handley maps and photographs

Hamlets in Derbyshire
North East Derbyshire District